The North Island stout-legged wren or Grant-Mackie's wren (Pachyplichas jagmi) is an extinct species of New Zealand wren, a family of small birds endemic to New Zealand.

History and etymology
The holotype is a right tarsometatarsus (AU 7102.20 in the collections of the Auckland University Geology Department) collected on 25 August 1978 from the Ruakuri Cave in the Waitomo District of North Island of New Zealand.  The specific epithet honours Dr John Grant-Mackie, Associate Professor of Geology at Auckland University, in recognition of his support for graduate students and for contributions to avian palaeontology.

Description
This wren is similar to, though smaller than, its congener from South Island, the South Island stout-legged wren (Pachyplichas yaldwyni), with which it forms a species pair. Its reduced wings and robust legs indicate that it was strongly adapted to a terrestrial existence and was either flightless or nearly so.

References

Notes

Sources
 

Extinct birds of New Zealand
Pachyplichas
Holocene extinctions
Fossil taxa described in 1988
Late Quaternary prehistoric birds
Birds described in 1988